Sara Teitelbaum (20 July 1910 – 7 June 1941) was an Estonian volleyball player, basketball player and athletics competitor.

She was born in Tapa. Her older brother was weightlifter Rubin Teitelbaum. She graduated from Tallinn Jews' Gymnasium.

She began her sporting career at the age of 15, coached by Ago Rooseste. She was multiple-times Estonian champion in different athletics disciplines.

She was a member of several basketball clubs, and volleyball clubs. She become multiple-times Estonian champion in basketball and volleyball.

She died on 7 June 1941 due to tuberculosis.

Personal best:
 60 m: 7,9
 100 m: 12,8
 200 m: 26,6
 400 m: 61,8
 800 m: 2.30,6
 long jump: 5.42
 shot put: 10.98
 discus throw: 33.74
 javelin throw: 35.94

References

1910 births
1941 deaths
People from Tapa, Estonia
People from Kreis Jerwen
Estonian Jews
Estonian female middle-distance runners
Estonian female sprinters
Estonian women's basketball players
Estonian women's volleyball players
Estonian female shot putters
Estonian female discus throwers
Estonian female javelin throwers
Estonian female long jumpers
Tuberculosis deaths in Estonia
20th-century deaths from tuberculosis